The North vs South match, sometimes known as the Interisland match was a longstanding rugby union fixture in New Zealand between the North Island and South Island teams.

The first match was played on 30 June 1897 at Wellington's Athletic Park, and the match became an annual fixture from 1902. Matches ceased during World War I from 1915 to 1918, but during World War II only the 1940, 1941 and 1942 matches were cancelled, with competition resuming in 1943. The last annual match on regular basis was played in 1986.

In 2012, a one-off match at Dunedin's Forsyth Barr Stadium in 2012 to help fundraise for the financially troubled Otago Rugby Football Union, which was won by the South 32–24.

A second one-off match was initially scheduled to be held on 29 August 2020, but due to the COVID-19 pandemic restrictions, it was postponed to 5 September 2020.

Most early matches were played in one of the four main cities (Auckland and Wellington in the North Island, Christchurch and Dunedin in the South Island), but from 1970 onwards the fixture was rotated around a number of provincial centres.

Colours
In the very first match in 1897, the North Island wore yellow and black jerseys while the South Island team wore all black.

Since 1904 the North Island traditionally played in black jerseys and black shorts, while the South Island played in white jerseys with white shorts.

List of results

Overall

References
 Lambert, M. and Palenski, R. 4th Air New Zealand Almanac, Moa Alamanac Press 1985.

Notes

Rugby union competitions in New Zealand
1897 establishments in New Zealand
Rugby union rivalries in New Zealand
Recurring sporting events established in 1897